Sri Lankans in Switzerland refer to Sri Lankans living in Switzerland. There are about 46,000 to 55,000 Swiss of Sri Lankan origin and Sri Lankan expatriates living in Switzerland.
Most of them are ethnic Tamils.

History
Since the 1990s Switzerland has had a relatively large Tamil population among Europe, almost all of them being refugees from Sri Lanka. Many had already been in the country for more than fifteen years due to the Sri Lankan Civil War.

LTTE in Switzerland
As well a providing refuge for some Sri Lankans, members of the Liberation Tigers of Tamil Eelam (LTTE or Tamil Tigers) have been based in Switzerland. The LTTE in Switzerland have been known as the Swiss Tigers. The Sri Lankan Tamil community in Switzerland has become LTTE sympathisers who have created a network of money power, man power and muscle power towards the tamil eelam independence movement back in Sri Lanka. Because of this Switzerland has been regarded as the “புலிகள் கோட்டை” (tiger fort) in Europe. Its contribution to the LTTE to the war effort has proportionately exceeded that of Tamils living in other Western countries.

End of the war
With the end of the Sri Lankan Civil War, LTTE  networks around the world were being shut down by both Sri Lankan and foreign governments. In 2011 the Swiss police arrested ten former LTTE representatives in the country for threatening, blackmailing and extortion of Tamils of the Sri Lankan diaspora to support the LTTE and the war effort financially. The funds were mainly used to buy weapons in Sri Lanka. Those arrested included the head of the LTTE in Switzerland Vijaratnam Sivanesan alias 'Ragu alias Ragupathy', his predecessor Chelliah Kularajasekeram alias 'Kulam' and the Swiss Tiger finance chief Chelliah Jeyapalan alias 'Abdullah'. They are facing charges of money laundering and belonging to a criminal organisation.

Demographics
Switzerland is home to around 32,000 to 42,000 Sri Lanka Tamils.

Organizations
Global Sri Lankan Forum
Sri Lankan Diaspora Switzerland (SLDS) This website has been taken offline in 2012.

Community
The Sri Sivasubramaniar Temple is a Hindu temple located in Adliswil in the Sihl Valley in the canton of Zürich and was established in 1994 as a non-profit foundation, as well as the Sri Vishnu Thurkkai Amman Temple, located in the municipality of Dürnten in the canton of Zürich in 2010. The Tamil community established some more temples in Switzerland, among them the temple of the Saivanerikoodam association in the Haus der Religionen in Bern in December 2014. Thus being a minority of the Tamil people living in Switzerland, Zentrum für Migrationskirchen (literally: Centre for migration churches) in Zürich-Wipkingen houses among others the Oikos church that has its origins in Sri Lanka and was founded in 2004.

Notable people

See also
 Sri Lanka – Switzerland relations

References

External links
 Sri Lankan Diaspora Switzerland
 Federal Department of Foreign Affairs, Sri Lanka
 Ramifications of crackdown on LTTE in Switzerland

Immigration to Switzerland
Sri Lankan diaspora